HeadCount is a national non-profit organization that works with musicians to promote participation in democracy in the United States. It is best known for registering voters at concerts – having signed up over 1,000,000 voters since its launch in 2004.

Origins
The organization was co-founded in 2004 by Marc Brownstein, bass player for the popular electronic rock band The Disco Biscuits, and his friend Andy Bernstein, author of The Pharmer's Almanac, a series of books about Phish. As of July 2019, Peter Shapiro serves as chairman of the board, Bernstein is executive director of the organization, and Brownstein is a board member with the title "founder, chairman emeritus".

Activities
Some of HeadCount's higher-profile activity includes the release of public service announcements starring Jay-Z and Dave Matthews, a compilation album featuring Pearl Jam, Wilco and Phish, and various activities involving board member Bob Weir of the Grateful Dead. HeadCount also has served as the voter registration partner for the March for Our Lives movement, as well as Spotify, SoundCloud, American Eagle Outfitters, and The Grammys.

For the 2020 election, the organization registered roughly 400,000 voters, through its work with Ariana Grande, Spotify, YouTuber David Dobrik, and hundreds of other musicians, brands and partners. Although HeadCount is largely known for its on-the-ground work registering voters at concerts, and is a mainstay at festivals like Bonnaroo and Lollapalooza, the Coronavirus pandemic did not stop the organization's momentum. Instead, it had its best election cycle ever.

This followed many years of activity combining music, culture and democratic participation.

For the Midterm Elections in 2018, HeadCount also rolled out a campaign called "The Future is Voting" featuring many elements, including an anthem film, a get-out-the-vote tour, and a series of limited edition Levi's Trucker Jackets worn by musicians and social media influencers for National Voter Registration Day. Earlier that year, HeadCount ran the voter registration efforts for March for Our Lives, the organization created by students from Parkland, FL after the mass shooting at their high school.

HeadCount is a founder of National Voter Registration Day and stages a massive social media campaign around it each year. The campaign has featured hundreds of musicians and entertainers posting "Register to Vote" photos on Facebook, Twitter and Instagram, with a link to an online voter registration form. Participants included Stephen Colbert, Jon Stewart, Fergie, Russell Simmons and The Black Keys.

In 2016 HeadCount partnered with music streaming services Spotify and Pandora Radio to help music fans vote. American Spotify users received a message from President Barack Obama directing them to HeadCount.org for voter information. Pandora ran short HeadCount Get-Out-The-Vote PSA's 750 million times and helped over 10,000 voters register through ads on the app. HeadCount also partnered with Ben & Jerry's to hand out free ice cream on Phish tour to fans that registered or pledged to vote. HeadCount works with the non-partisan VoteRiders organization to spread state-specific information on voter ID requirements. And for the first time ever, HeadCount registered voters at every stop on Vans Warped Tour.

Beyond concerts, HeadCount has a large presence on the Internet. Its blog features updates on "music, politics and everything in between," and it launched a platform called #SoundOff (www.SoundOffatCongress.org) for Tweeting directly at members of Congress.

In 2008 HeadCount produced the documentary A Call to Action, which has aired on cable television. In early 2012 HeadCount conceived and produced "The Bridge Session" a live performance from Bob Weir's TRI Studios featuring Weir, members of the National and various other guests. A live webcast on Yahoo! also featured a roundtable political discussion. The collaborations in that session led to Day of the Dead and Blue Mountain.

The non-profit also runs the "Capitol Community" program for the Capitol Theatre (Port Chester, New York), which sends school teachers to the Rock and Roll Hall of Fame and Museum for curriculum training.

Participation Row
HeadCount manages Participation Row activism villages at various music festivals including Lockn' (2013, 2014, 2015, 2016) in Arrington, VA, True Music (2013) in Scottsdale, AZ, Phases of the Moon (2014) in Danville, IL, FloydFest (2016) near Floyd, VA the Okeechobee Music & Arts Festival in Okeechobee, FL, The Traveler's Rest Festival in Montana, and Newport Folk Festival and Newport Jazz Festival in Rhode Island. HeadCount also put on a Participation Row for the Dead & Company tours, which was preceded by Fare Thee Well: Celebrating 50 Years of the Grateful Dead in both Levi's Stadium and Soldier Field and on Dead & Company's 2016 Summer Tour. Participation Row traditionally hosts 8-16 different non-profits, allowing concert-goers to take actions related to the non-profits. Each Participation Row has also included a silent auction of signed merchandise, with proceeds going to the participating non-profits. At the Fare Thee Well shows, the Participation Row silent auction included a D'Angelico EX-DC electric guitar signed by all 7 performers and played by Bob Weir on stage during the second Santa Clara show. The auction for the guitar closed at $526,000 , making it the 20th most expensive guitar of all time .

Structure
Since its inception, HeadCount has been largely volunteer-driven. It fields volunteer teams in most major U.S. cities. Each consists of a trained team leader who runs the local operations, and a cadre of volunteers. These teams then set up tables at concerts through which they register voters and disseminate information related to political issues and upcoming elections. This approach has allowed HeadCount to keep its operating costs low while reaching a very large number of people.  In any given year, the organization sets up these tables at 500 to 1,500 concerts or more.

HeadCount is supported by a Board of Directors including Grateful Dead guitarist Bob Weir.

HeadCount is based in New York City, but has volunteer street teams all over the U.S.

References

External links
 HeadCount.org
 Dave Matthews Band Urge Fans to Vote
 Disco Biscuits Were Toasted to a Delicious Golden Brown in '06
 An Interview with Andy Bernstein of HeadCount

Election and voting-related organizations based in the United States
Non-profit organizations based in New York City
Head
Voter registration